Svetlana Yuryevna Zakharova (born 10 June 1979) is a Ukrainian prima ballerina who dance with the Bolshoi Ballet and an étoile of the La Scala Theatre Ballet.

Early life 
At the age of six, she was taken by her mother to learn folk dancing at a local studio, and by the age of 10, she had auditioned and was accepted into the Kyiv Choreography School. Valeria Sulegina was one of her teachers.

In 1995, after six years at the Kyiv School, Zakharova entered the Young Dancers' Competition (Vaganova-Prix) in St. Petersburg. The youngest contestant, she took second prize and was invited to continue her training in the graduating course of St Petersburg's Vaganova Academy. It was the first time in the school's history to allow a student to skip two grades.

After attending the pre-eminent Russian ballet school for one year, Zakharova then joined the Mariinsky ballet in 1996.

Mariinsky Ballet 
Zakharova debuted with the Mariinsky Ballet in 1996, appearing as Maria with Ruben Bobovnikov, in Rostislav Zakharov's The Fountain of Bakhchisarai.

In 1997, after her first year with the Mariinsky, at 18, Zakharova was promoted to principal dancer. Her first partner was principal Igor Zelensky. Olga Moiseyeva was her coach.

Bolshoi Ballet 
By 2003, Zakharova "was getting itchy feet" at the Mariinsky, and moved to the Bolshoi Ballet. The offer from the Bolshoi company was longstanding, and the departure from the Mariinsky was reportedly due to discontent with that company, as well as personal invitation from the legendary Vladimir Vasiliev.

Zakharova is coached by Lyudmila Semenyaka.

Rise to fame 
From 1999 on, Zakharova regularly performed as a guest soloist at the Paris Opera where she worked with French choreographer Pierre Lacotte. Lacotte is viewed as a leading authority on classical ballet contributing to the career of Evgenia Obraztsova and Hannah O'Neill. Svetlana Zakharova was the first Ukrainian-born russian principal dancer performing in Paris and became a world star as of 2000. 

Successful assignments followed, ranging from great classical roles like Giselle, Odette-Odile in "Swan Lake", Aurora in "Sleeping Beauty", and Nikiya in "La Bayadère," to such modern works as Balanchine's "Serenade", "Symphony in C" and "Apollo" as well as McMillan's "Manon" and Neumeier's "Now and Then"

At La Scala Theatre Ballet in Italy,  Zakharova danced with partner Roberto Bolle in Swan Lake, Giselle, The Sleeping Beauty, and La Bayadère.

Other notable appearances: Zakharova was one of the dancers featured in the 2006 documentary Ballerina. She has presented her own TV programme (Svetlana) on Russian television, a festival of children's dance running from 2015 to 2018. As of July 2020, she is also presenting "Bolshoi Ballet", a ballet competition for professional ballet dancers. She has performed in her own solo programme, sold out across Europe, "Modanse", a more modern ballet, and "Coco", an homage to Coco Chanel featuring costumes from the eponymous design house.

Awards 
 1997 : Vaganova-Prix Young Dancers Competition, Sankt-Peterburg (2nd prize)
 1999 : Golden Mask for Serenade
 2000 : Golden Mask for The Sleeping Beauty
 2005 : Prix Benois de la Danse for Hippolita (Titania) in A Midsummer Night's Dream
 2006 : State Prize of the Russian Federation
 2008 People's artist of Russia
 2008 Elected State Duma deputy ( Russian parliament)
 2015 : Prix Benois de la Danse for Marguerite Gautier in "The Lady of the Camellias" by John Neumeier and Mekhmene-Banu in "Légende d'amour" by Yury Grigorovich

Personal life 
Zakharova is married to Russian violinist Vadim Repin, and they have one child, daughter Anna (b. 2011). She had withdrawn from the Bolshoi Ballet tour to London in the summer of 2010 citing a hip injury; she was pregnant at the time.

She named the Italian dancer Roberto Bolle as one of her favorite partners.

A member of United Russia party, Zakharova was a supporter of Russian President Vladimir Putin and the annexation of Crimea by the Russian Federation during the Russo-Ukrainian War, which led to a break in her relationship with the Kyiv Choreographic School in particular.

References

External links

Svetlana Zakharova's page, at the Bolchoi Theatre

1979 births
Living people
People from Lutsk
La Scala Theatre Ballet dancers
Prima ballerinas
Russian ballerinas
State Prize of the Russian Federation laureates
Bolshoi Ballet principal dancers
21st-century Russian ballet dancers
Fifth convocation members of the State Duma (Russian Federation)
Pro-Russian people of the 2014 pro-Russian unrest in Ukraine